Fults may refer to:-

Fults, Illinois, a village
The Fults Hill Prairie State Natural Area
Ralph Fults, depression era outlaw and escape artist